South Korean boy group Shinee have received several awards and nominations for their music work. The group was formed by SM Entertainment in 2008 and released their first full-length album, The Shinee World, on August 28, 2008, which won the Newcomer Album of the Year at the 23rd Golden Disk Awards. The first single released from the album was "Love Like Oxygen", which won first place on M Countdown on September 18, 2008, making it the group's first win on Korean music shows since debut. Their second album Lucifer (2010) produced two singles, "Lucifer" and "Hello". For their outstanding choreography the group was nominated for the Best Dance Performance Award at the Mnet Asian Music Awards in 2010. Lucifer also won the Disk Bonsang Award at the 25th Golden Disk Awards, as well as the Popularity Award. On March 21, 2012, the group released their fourth EP Sherlock, for which the group was awarded another Disk Bonsang Award at the 27th Golden Disc Awards and the Bonsang Award at the 22nd Seoul Music Award. Following the success of the lead single, it was nominated for Song of the Year at the 2012 Mnet Asian Music Awards.

Following Shinee's successful promotions for their third Korean studio album, which was divided into two parts, the group was crowned Artist of the Year at the Melon Music Awards in 2013 — one of the biggest award ceremonies in the country, which hands out prizes based on digital sales and online votes. The group has also gained recognition for their fashion style, like the Ceci Asia Icon Award at the 28th Golden Disk Awards, as well as for their unique dance performances, winning the Best Dance Performance Award at the Mnet Asian Music Awards three times in a row. The group has also been awarded the Communication Design Award Package at the Red Dot Design Award several times for their album design.


Awards and nominations

Other accolades

State and cultural honors

Listicles

Notes

References

Shinee
Awards